Brian Blake (born 1960) is an American logger, forester, and politician.  

Brian Blake may also refer to:

Other people
M. Brian Blake (born 1971), American computer scientist
Brian Blake (darts player), see Houston Open (darts)
 Brian Blake, drummer for Real Friends

Fictional characters
 The Governor (The Walking Dead), fictional given name Brian Blake
Brian Blake, character in Enemy of the State